The United States District Court for the Northern District of New York (in case citations, N.D.N.Y.) serves one of the 94 judicial districts in the United States and one of four in the state of New York. Appeals from the Northern District of New York are taken to the United States Court of Appeals for the Second Circuit, which has jurisdiction over the four districts of New York, the District of Connecticut and the District of Vermont (except for patent claims and claims against the U.S. government under the Tucker Act, which are appealed to the Federal Circuit). The U.S. Attorney for the district is Carla B. Freedman since October 8, 2021.

Its jurisdiction comprises the counties of Albany, Broome, Cayuga, Chenango, Clinton, Columbia, Cortland, Delaware, Essex, Franklin, Fulton, Greene, Hamilton, Herkimer, Jefferson, Lewis, Madison, Montgomery, Oneida, Onondaga, Oswego, Otsego, Rensselaer, Saratoga, Schenectady, Schoharie, St. Lawrence, Tioga, Tompkins, Ulster, Warren, and Washington.

The court has offices in Albany, Binghamton, Plattsburgh, Syracuse, and Utica. The court also holds court at facilities in Watertown. The court accepts filings from members of the bar through an automated case management system CM/ECF over the Internet.

History 
The Northern District is a successor to the original District of New York, which was split into Northern and Southern Districts on April 9, 1814. The United States District Court for the District of New York was the first District Court ever convened under the sovereignty of the United States, with Judge James Duane presiding on November 3, 1789. The Northern District was split again in 1900, giving rise to the United States District Court for the Western District of New York. The first judge in the Northern District of New York was Matthias Burnett Tallmadge. The district now covers thirty-two counties in upstate New York, with an extensive border with Canada to the north.

Current judges 
:

Former judges

Chief judges

Succession of seats

See also 
 Courts of New York
 List of current United States district judges
 List of United States federal courthouses in New York
 United States Attorney for the Northern District of New York

References

External links 
 United States District Court for the Northern District of New York Official Website
 United States Attorney for the Northern District of New York Official Website

 
New York, Northern
New York (state) law
Organizations based in Albany, New York
Binghamton, New York
Clinton County, New York
Courts in Syracuse, New York
Utica, New York
Jefferson County, New York
1814 establishments in New York (state)
Courthouses in New York (state)
Courts and tribunals established in 1814